George Oscar Thompson House, also known as the Sam Ward Bishop House, was a historic home located near Tazewell, Tazewell County, Virginia. It was built in 1886–1887, and was a two-story, three bay, "T"-shaped frame dwelling.  It had a foundation of rubble limestone. The front facade featured a one-story porch on the center bay supported by chamfered posts embellished with sawn brackets.  Also on the property were a contributing limestone spring house, a one-room log structure (late 18th- to early 19th-century), and a -story frame structure (1831 through 1851). Tradition suggests the latter buildings were the first and second houses built by the Thompson family.

The house was listed on the National Register of Historic Places in 1982. 

It was demolished by 2017, when a new house was photographed under construction on this site.

References

Houses on the National Register of Historic Places in Virginia
Houses completed in 1887
Houses in Tazewell County, Virginia
National Register of Historic Places in Tazewell County, Virginia